Delta Mensae, Latinized from δ Mensae, is a binary star system in the southern constellation of Mensa. It is faintly visible to the naked eye, having an apparent visual magnitude of 5.69. Based upon an annual parallax shift of 7.70 mas as seen from the Earth, it is 420 light years from the Sun.

The primary, designated component A, is a K-type giant star with a stellar classification of K2/3 III. With the supply of hydrogen at its core exhausted, it has cooled and expanded to 13 times the radius of the Sun. The star is radiating 112 times the Sun's luminosity from its photosphere at an effective temperature of 5,180 K. Its companion, component B, is an A-type star about 0.9 magnitudes fainter than the primary.

References

K-type giants
A-type stars
Binary stars

Mensa (constellation)
Mensae, Delta
Durchmusterung objects
028525
028525
1426